The Turing Guide, written by Jack Copeland, Jonathan Bowen, Mark Sprevak, Robin Wilson, and others and published in 2017, is a book about the work and life of the British mathematician, philosopher, and early computer scientist, Alan Turing (1912–1954).

Overview
The book includes 42 contributed chapters by a variety of authors, including some contemporaries of Alan Turing. The book was published in January 2017 by Oxford University Press, in hardcover, paperback, and e-book formats.

Contents
The Turing Guide is divided into eight main parts, covering various aspects of Alan Turing's life and work:

 Biography: Biographical aspects of Alan Turing.
 The Universal Machine and Beyond: Turing's universal machine (now known as a Turing machine), developed while at King's College, Cambridge, which provides a theoretical framework for reasoning about computation, a starting point for the field of theoretical computer science.
 Codebreaker: Turing's work on codebreaking during World War II at Bletchley Park, especially the Bombe for decrypting the German Enigma machine.
 Computers after the War: Turing's post-War work on computing, at the National Physical Laboratory (NPL) and at the University of Manchester. He made contributions to both hardware design, through the ACE computer (later implemented as the Pilot ACE) at the NPL, and software, especially at Manchester using the Manchester Baby computer, later the Manchester Mark 1 and Ferranti Mark 1. 
 Artificial Intelligence and the Mind: Turing's pioneering and philosophical contribution to machine intelligence (now known as Artificial Intelligence or AI), including the Turing test.
 Biological Growth: Morphogenesis, Turing's last major scientific contribution, on the generation of complex patterns through chemical processes in biology and on the mathematics behind them, foundational in mathematical biology.
 Mathematics: Some of Turing's mathematical achievements, including one of his most significant influences, Max Newman. 
 Finale: Turing in a wider subsequent context, including his influence and legacy to science and in the public consciousness.

The book includes a foreword by Andrew Hodges, preface, notes on the contributors, endnotes, and an index.

Contributors
The following 33 authors contributed to chapters in the book:

Ruth Baker
Mavis Batey
Margaret Boden
Jonathan Bowen
Martin Campbell-Kelly
Brian Carpenter
Catherine Caughey
Jack Copeland
Robert Doran
Rod Downey
Ivor Grattan-Guinness
Joel Greenberg
Simon Greenish
Peter Hilton
Eleanor Ireland
David Leavitt
Jason Long
Philip Maini
Dani Prinz
Diane Proudfoot
Brian Randell
Bernard Richards
Jerry Roberts
Oron Shagrir
Edward Simpson
Mark Sprevak
Doron Swade
Sir John Dermot Turing
Jean Valentine
Robin Whitty
Robin Wilson
Stephen Wolfram
Thomas Wooley

Reviews
The book has been reviewed by a number of journals, magazines, and professional organizations, including:

 Engineering & Technology.
 European Mathematical Society.
 Formal Aspects of Computing.
 Mathematical Association of America.
 New Scientist.
 Notices of the American Mathematical Society.
 Nuncius.
 Physics World.
 Resurrection.
 SIAM News.

The book has also been featured online internationally, including in China.

See also
 Andrew Hodges, Alan Turing: The Enigma (1983).
 Charles Petzold, The Annotated Turing (2008).

References

2017 non-fiction books
Computer science books
Cryptography books
21st-century history books
Books about the history of mathematics
Biographies and autobiographies of mathematicians
Biographies about philosophers
British biographies
Books about scientists
Oxford University Press books
Cultural depictions of Alan Turing
History of computing